Donna McKechnie (born November 16, 1942) is an American musical theater dancer, singer, actress, and choreographer.  She is known for her professional and personal relationship with choreographer Michael Bennett, with whom she collaborated on her most noted role, the character of Cassie in the musical A Chorus Line. She earned the Tony Award for Best Actress in a Musical for this performance in 1976.  She is also known for playing Amanda Harris/Olivia Corey on the Gothic soap opera, Dark Shadows from 1969 to 1970.

Early life 
McKechnie was born in 1940 in Pontiac, Michigan, the daughter of Donald Bruce McKechnie and Carolyn Ruth Johnson.  She began ballet classes at age five. Her earliest influence was the classic British ballet film The Red Shoes (1948), which prompted her, at age eight, to plan a career as a ballerina. She studied for many years at the Rose Marie Floyd School of Dance in Royal Oak. Despite her parents' strong misgivings, she moved to New York City when she was 17. Rejected after an audition for the American Ballet Theatre, she found employment in the corps de ballet at Radio City Music Hall but walked off the job on the day of dress rehearsal to do summer stock at the Carousel Theatre in Framingham, Massachusetts. She studied theatre at HB Studio in New York City.

After doing a Welch's Grape Juice commercial and the first L'eggs stockings commercial, she was cast in a touring company of West Side Story. In 1961, she made her Broadway  debut in How to Succeed in Business Without Really Trying, where she met choreographer Bob Fosse and his wife, Gwen Verdon. A stint in a Philadelphia production of A Funny Thing Happened on the Way to the Forum (as Philia) was followed by the NBC music series Hullabaloo, on which she was a featured dancer. While working on Hullabaloo, she met Michael Bennett, who became her husband and a guiding force in her life and career.

She also appeared as Philia in the national tour of Forum, starring Jerry Lester (Pseudolus), with Paul Hartman (Senex), Erik Rhodes (Marcus Lycus), Arnold Stang (Hysterium) and Edward Everett Horton (Erronius), produced by Martin Tahse.

Broadway
In April, 1968, McKechnie was back on Broadway in the short-lived musical version of Leo Rosten's collection of short stories The Education of H*Y*M*A*N K*A*P*L*A*N, which led to a featured role in Burt Bacharach and Hal David's Promises, Promises, choreographed by Bennett. Along with Baayork Lee and Margo Sappington, she danced in one of Broadway's most famous numbers, "Turkey Lurkey Time", which was when she first began to attract notice from critics and theatergoers alike. This was followed by a role in the touring company of Call Me Madam, starring Ethel Merman.

Bennett showcased McKechnie again in Stephen Sondheim's Company (1970), where she danced "Tick-Tock". After leaving the Broadway cast, she reprised her role in the Los Angeles and London companies, and also toured in the 1971 revival of On the Town as Ivy. In March 1973, she choreographed and performed in the highly acclaimed one-night-only concert Sondheim: A Musical Tribute at the Shubert Theatre in New York. In 1974, she co-starred with Richard Kiley and Bob Fosse in the unsuccessful musical film version of the classic The Little Prince.

McKechnie was part of Bennett's group therapy-style workshops that evolved into the Broadway smash A Chorus Line, in which she portrayed Cassie, a character based in large part on herself. She danced her third famous Bennett-McKechnie number, "The Music and the Mirror", in which the vocal sections were tailored to her unusually wide range. Initially, Donna was to perform the number with four of her male co-stars; however, four previews before opening, McKechnie voiced concern about dancing around the four men, and at the last moment, Bennett changed the direction to have McKechnie perform the song-dance number alone. Her performance earned her the Tony Award for Best Actress in a Musical. The role of Maggie was also based on her life. She married Bennett in 1976, but after only a few months they separated and eventually divorced, although they remained good friends until his death from AIDS in 1987.

In 1980, McKechnie was diagnosed with arthritis and told she never would dance again. She went on to choreograph NFL's Football's Fabulous Females, The Los Angeles Raiderettes in 1983 as they made their debut in L.A. The same year, in season 2 of the TV show Family Ties, she played Cynthia, a divorcee who planned to move west with her young son away from his father. McKechnie pursued various physical, psychological, and holistic healing remedies, and was well enough to return to the Broadway company of A Chorus Line in 1986. Later in the 1980s, she toured in Sweet Charity and Annie Get Your Gun, and she appeared in a London revival of Can-Can. She also participated in the Chorus Line extravaganza to celebrate its then record-breaking run on Broadway in September 1983.

Later career
Her television work included a regular role on the Gothic soap opera Dark Shadows early in her career. After her rise to fame, she made guest appearances on Scarecrow and Mrs. King, Rowan & Martin's Laugh In, and Cheers (as Debra, the ex-wife of Sam Malone). She played Suzi Laird on several episodes of Fame.

In the early 1990s, McKechnie appeared off-Broadway twice, first in a revue entitled Cut the Ribbons, followed by Annie Warbucks, a less successful sequel to the hit Annie. In 1993, she reunited with most of the original cast of Company for  three concert performances. In 1996, she was awarded the Fred Astaire Award for Best Female Dancer for her performance in a Broadway adaptation of Richard Rodgers and Oscar Hammerstein II's film State Fair. In the same year, she was in a production of You Never Know at the Pasadena Playhouse. In February, 1997, she played Phyllis in a concert performance of Follies at London's Drury Lane Theatre, and the following year took on the role of Sally in a production of that same show at the Paper Mill Playhouse in New Jersey. McKechnie also starred opposite Carol Lawrence in the Los Angeles and New York production of Joni Fritz's Girl's Room, produced by Dennis Grimaldi and directed and choreographed by Lynne Taylor-Corbett, both former Michael Bennett dancers.

In 2001, McKechnie created the role of Lela Rogers, mother of Ginger Rogers, in the world premiere of Ginger: The Musical.

In 2002, McKechnie starred in the pre-Broadway production of the Jerry Herman musical revue Showtune. In recent years, she has toured periodically in her one-woman show Inside the Music, a potpourri of songs, dances and anecdotes about her life in the theater and her successful battle with arthritis, directed by her old Chorus Line castmate, Thommie Walsh. Her autobiography, Time Steps: My Musical Comedy Life, written with Greg Lawrence, was published by Simon & Schuster on August 29, 2006, only weeks before the Broadway revival of A Chorus Line opened on October 5.

In June 2010, McKechnie appeared at the Adelaide Cabaret Festival.

McKechnie was on the faculty of HB Studio in New York City. In 2015, she served as the standby for Chita Rivera in Kander and Ebb's musical  The Visit on Broadway.

In the fall of 2017, McKechnie appeared as Mabel in The Pajama Game produced by Arena Stage in Washington, D.C.

Stage credits

Awards and nominations 
Awards
 1976 Tony Award Best Actress in a Musical – A Chorus Line
 1976 Drama Desk Award Outstanding Actress in a Musical – A Chorus Line
 1976 Theatre World Special Award – A Chorus Line
Nominations
 1996 Drama Desk Award Outstanding Featured Actress in a Musical – State Fair

References

Further reading
 Mandelbaum, Ken (1990). A Chorus Line and the Musicals of Michael Bennett. St Martins Press, 
 Viagas, Robert (2nd edition, 1990). On the Line - The Creation of A Chorus Line. Limelight Editions, 
 Stevens, Gary (2000).  The Longest Line: Broadway's Most Singular Sensation: A Chorus Line. Applause Books, 
 Flinn, Denny Martin (1989). What They Did for Love: The Untold Story Behind the Making of 'A Chorus Line' . Bantam, 
 Kelly, Kevin (1990). One Singular Sensation: The Michael Bennett Story. Doubleday,

External links
 Donna McKechnie official website
 
 
 
Broadway Bullet interview with Donna McKechnie (October 19, 2006)
Donna McKechnie - Downstage Center interview at American Theatre Wing.org, October 2006

American musical theatre actresses
American women singers
Actresses from Detroit
Tony Award winners
American female dancers
Dancers from Michigan
Drama Desk Award winners
1942 births
Living people
Musicians from Pontiac, Michigan
20th-century American actresses
21st-century American actresses
Singers from Detroit